Doğan Avcıoğlu (1926–1983) was a Turkish writer, journalist and politician.

Biography
Doğan Avcıoğlu was born in Mustafakemalpaşa ilçe (district) of Bursa Province in 1926. After completing high school, he traveled to France for studies in political science and economy. He returned to Turkey in 1955. In 1956, he began writing in political magazines such as Akis. He joined the Republican People's Party (CHP). He served in the research bureau of the party and wrote in the party paper Ulus. In 1961, he served in the Constituent Assembly of Turkey as a CHP representative. Between 1963 and 1965, he served in the research bureau of TÜRK-İŞ, the Confederation of Turkish Trade Unions. Between 1968 and 1969, he was a member of the consultative committee of CHP. Following the 1971 Turkish military memorandum, he was arrested, but was acquitted.

He died on 4 November 1983 in İstanbul from stomach cancer. He was buried in Büyükada.

Periodicals
Between 1961 and 1967, he collaborated with Mümtaz Soysal and Cemal Reşit Eyüboğlu to publish Yön, a political magazine, which was an important socialist periodical. Between 1969 and 1971, he published Devrim, a weekly newspaper on the same track.

Books
He wrote a number of books some in several volumes:
 Atatürkçülük Milliyetçilik, Sosyalizm ("Kemalism, Nationalism, Socialism") 
 Devrin ve Demokrasi Üzerine ("On Revolution and Democracy") 
 Türkiye'nin Düzeni ("Organisation of Turkey")
 Milli Kurtuluş Tarihi ("History of National Salvation")
 31 Martta Yabancı Parmağı ("Foreign Intervention to 31 March Incident")
 Osmanlı'nın Düzeni ("Organisation of the Ottoman Empire")- post mortem book
 ''Turklerin Tarihi 5 Cilt' ("History of Turks 5 Volumes")

References

20th-century newspaper publishers (people)
1926 births
1983 deaths
Deaths from cancer in Turkey
Deaths from stomach cancer
People from Mustafakemalpaşa
Republican People's Party (Turkey) politicians
Turkish columnists
Ulus (newspaper) people
Turkish magazine founders
Turkish political people